Admiral Richmond may refer to:

Alfred C. Richmond (1902–1984), U.S. Coast Guard admiral
Herbert Richmond (1871–1946), British Royal Navy admiral
Julius B. Richmond (1916–2008), U.S. Public Health Service Commissioned Corps vice admiral
Maxwell Richmond (1900–1986), New Zealand-born British Royal Navy vice admiral